In London is a studio album by Hindustani classical musician Ravi Shankar. It was published on LP record in 1964, originally with the title India's Master Musician / Recorded in London.

In the late 1990s, Squires Productions was commissioned to digitally remaster the album for Compact Disc; Wayne Hileman was the mastering engineer. Angel Records published the remastered album on 26 January 1999 under the shortened title In London.

Personnel
Ravi Shankar, sitar
Kanai Dutt, tabla
Nodu Mullick, tambura
Richard Bock, record producer

Track listing

References

1964 albums
Ravi Shankar albums
Angel Records albums
World Pacific Records albums
Albums produced by Richard Bock (producer)